Gesellschaft für Angewandte Mathematik und Mechanik ("Society of Applied Mathematics and Mechanics"), often referred to by the acronym GAMM, is a German society for the promotion of science, founded in 1922 by the physicist Ludwig Prandtl and the mathematician Richard von Mises.  The society awards the Richard von Mises prize annually.

In 1958 the GAMM and the ACM together worked out the "ALGOL 58 Report" at a meeting in Zurich.

External links 
 Official site (German)
 

Scientific organisations based in Germany
Mathematical societies
Scientific organizations established in 1922
1922 establishments in Germany